The 1937 Washington Huskies football team was an American football team that represented the University of Washington during the 1937 college football season. In its eighth season under head coach Jimmy Phelan, the team compiled a 7–2–2 record, finished in third place in the Pacific Coast Conference, and outscored all opponents by a combined total of 187 to 52. Frank Waskowitz was the team captain.

Schedule

NFL Draft selections
One University of Washington Husky was selected in the 1938 NFL Draft, which lasted twelve rounds, with 110 selections.

References

Washington
Washington Huskies football seasons
Poi Bowl champion seasons
Washington Huskies football